is a town located in Kasuya District, Fukuoka Prefecture, Japan. As of April 1, 2017, the town has an estimated population of 45,307 and a density of 5,200 persons per km2. The total area is 8.70 km2.

Although the town still has a railway station the line is no longer used, but has been converted into a cycle path/ footpath.

References

External links

Shime official website 

Towns in Fukuoka Prefecture